KK Kumanovo is a professional basketball club based in Kumanovo, North Macedonia. They currently play in the Macedonian First League. The club play their home matches at the Sports Hall Kumanovo.

History
Founded: 1946 Name: KK Kumanovo 2009 (09-). After the founding in 1946, the team was only able to achieve national successes in 1980. In the 90s Kumanovo team qualified for the Korac Cup 1998/99 , in which they lost a two-legged home game against KK Krka as well as two years later in the same competition against the BK Jambol. A season later, they also moved into the 2002 play-off final series for the Macedonian championship, in which they lost two to four wins against record champions and defending champion Feršped Rabotnički from the capital Skopje. Already in the following season the team could not keep up due to payment difficulties and occupied a relegation zone.

After the club Pop Sport VSA from Kumanovo had tried a season largely unsuccessfully in the top division, the team of the club returned as Kumanovo 2009 in the 2010/11 season to the Prva Liga Macedonia. After being re-established in the top division, the first successes were achieved when one reached the cup final in 2013, which was lost to defending champion and champion KK MZT Skopje, and on the other hand in the supranational Balkan League when it participated for the first time reached the Final Four tournament, in which they lost to the title holder Hapoel Gilboa Galil in the semi-finals. With the following participation, the team in the Balkan League 2014 in the quarter-finals against the later title winner Lewski Sofia and also achieved no chances of winning the title in national competitions. This was to change in the 2014/15 season, when the team beat record champion Rabotnički in the play-off semi-final of the championship after beating Rilski Sportist Samokov in the quarterfinals of the Balkan League. In the final series, however, they lost in three games against defending champion KK MZT Aerodrom. For the 2015/16 season, the team registered for the FIBA Europe Cup 2015/16 and refrained from further participation in the Balkan League. In the continental club competition, in six preliminary round matches, it was only enough for one home win against Kotkan TP-Basket. In the national championship play-offs, the third round of the semifinals was still played in five games and, in the final series, they were able to achieve at least one home win against series master MZT before losing another chance of winning the title in four games.

BIBL League Seasons 
 2013: (9-11) 4th
 2014: (7-11) 5th
 2015: (10-6) 5th
 2017: (13-7) 2nd 
 2018: (1-4 ) 8th
 2021: (6-8) 5th
 2022: (0-2) 12th

Honours
Macedonian Basketball League Champions 
 Winner : 1980
 Runner-up:  2002, 2015, 2016
Macedonian Basketball Cup  
 Runner-up:  2013

BIBL 
 Runner-up:  2017

Home ground

Kumanovo Arena is a home ground indoor sport venue for BC Kumanovo located in Kumanovo, Macedonia. The hall has capacity of 6,500 seats and was built in 1980.

It is the biggest indoor sport hall in Kumanovo, where competitions of basketball, futsal, handball, volleyball and boxing matches

Current roster

Depth chart

Technical staff

Management

Former players

 Aleksandar Kostoski
 Dejan Trajanovski
 Goran Dimitrijević
 Igor Mihajlovski
 Gjorgji Knjazev
 Mirza Kurtović
 Pero Blazevski
 Dimitar Mirakovski
 Srdjan Stanković
 Boris Nešović
 Dimitar Karadzovski
 Bojan Trajkovski
 Marko Simonovski
 Marjan Janevski
 Vukašin Mandić
 Uroš Luković
 Branislav Đekić
 Nemanja Jelesijević
 Milan Janjušević
 Saša Avramović
 Nenad Mišanović
 Ivan Mišković
 Darko Matić
 Vladimir Filipović
 Otis Livingston II
 Malik Evans
 Anthony Lee-Ingram
 Royce Parran
 Žarko Rakočević
 Igor Bijelić
 Nemanja Vranješ

Head coaches

 Aleksandar Todorov 
 Steruli Andonovski
 Goran Dimitrijević
 Marjan Srbinovski
 Igor Mihajlovski
 Strašo Todorović
 Ljubisav Luković

References

External links
Team info at MKF
Eurobasket.com KK Kumanovo Page
Supporters Website
Media supporter Website

Basketball teams in North Macedonia
Sport in Kumanovo
Basketball teams in Yugoslavia